My Love: Essential Collection is a greatest hits album by Canadian recording artist Celine Dion. It was released by Columbia Records on 24 October 2008 as the follow up to her previous English-language compilation, All the Way... A Decade of Song (1999). In the album's liner notes, she dedicated this collection of songs, recorded between 1990 and 2008, to her fans who supported her throughout the years. My Love: Essential Collection was released as a single disc, consisting of Dion's most successful singles, including: "My Heart Will Go On", "Because You Loved Me", "The Power of Love" and "It's All Coming Back to Me Now". The two-disc edition, entitled My Love: Ultimate Essential Collection, has been further expanded to include more hits and rare songs that have not previously appeared on her albums. Both editions include one new track, "There Comes a Time". The album wasn't released in Japan because Sony Music Entertainment decided to issue a different compilation there, Complete Best.

My Love: Essential Collection received a positive response. It topped the albums charts in the Netherlands, Belgium and Ireland, as well as the compilation album chart in France. My Love: Essential Collection debuted at number two in Canada, number five in the United Kingdom and number eight in the United States, and was certified four-times Platinum in the UK, double-Platinum in Canada and Ireland, Platinum in Belgium and Gold in Mexico, Finland, New Zealand and Hungary. The first single from the album, "My Love", was a semi-autobiographic song written for Dion by Linda Perry, originally available on Taking Chances (2007). In France, a remix of "I'm Alive" was released as a promotional single instead. In July 2011, My Love: Ultimate Essential Collection was re-issued with the same track listings as part of Sony's The Essential line. A limited-edition, titled The Essential 3.0, was also released in the United States in August 2011 with a bonus third CD with seven more tracks.

Background
Dion took the stage for her final performance of A New Day... on 15 December 2007. The Las Vegas show that had been viewed by nearly three million spectators at 717 performances since its premier in March 2003 had come to an end. On 14 February 2008, she embarked on her first worldwide concert tour in over nine years. Dion performed her biggest hits along with songs from her new album, Taking Chances. The Taking Chances World Tour played to sold-out stadiums and arenas throughout 2008. By its completion, at the end of February 2009, it had crossed five continents, twenty-three countries, and ninety-three cities, en route to playing for an audience of over three million people. On 27 August 2008, Dion's official website announced that a new greatest hits album would be released in October 2008. On 5 September 2008, it was revealed that the album will be available in two formats: a one-disc edition called My Love: Essential Collection as well as a two-disc edition called My Love: Ultimate Essential Collection, with the track listing posted on 11 September 2008. "My Love", originally from Taking Chances, was confirmed as the first single in an official press release on 22 September 2008. My Love: Essential Collection features a live version of the song, which premiered on 17 September 2008 and the live music video was released seven days later. The lyrics to the only new track on the album, "There Comes a Time" were posted on 7 October 2008 on Dion's official website and an excerpt of the song was posted on 23 October 2008.

The artwork for My Love: Essential Collection features a close-up shot of Dion, wearing a white blouse with a black camera hanging from her neck. The cover's background is blurred white and purple imagery, with the singer's name and the album title written in white letters. The photography was done by Denise Truscello, and shot in a studio in Los Angeles in 2007. Dion was very grateful working with Truscello, and described their professional experience positively: "Out of all the people I've worked with, she's the absolute best. I've worked with her for six years, and she's always kind to everybody. Super, super kind".

Content
My Love: Essential Collection features seventeen songs on the US version and eighteen songs on the European version of the album. The US version includes the Billboard Hot 100 number one singles: "The Power of Love", "Because You Loved Me", "My Heart Will Go On" and "I'm Your Angel", and the European version contains the UK number one single, "Think Twice".

The two-disc edition, entitled My Love: Ultimate Essential Collection was released simultaneously. It is a twenty-seven song set on the US version and thirty-six song set on the European version. My Love: Ultimate Essential Collection released in the United States contains three rare songs not released on a Dion record: "(You Make Me Feel Like) A Natural Woman" (from Tapestry Revisited: A Tribute to Carole King), "Dance with My Father" (from So Amazing: An All-Star Tribute to Luther Vandross), and "I Knew I Loved You" (from We All Love Ennio Morricone). The European version also includes singles successful in Europe.

In July 2011, the album was re-issued as part of The Essential series, featuring either the US or European track listing (depending on the country of release). A limited edition, titled The Essential 3.0, was released exclusively in the United States on 29 August 2011. It was expanded with a bonus third CD with seven tracks, including alternate versions of "Think Twice" and "Only One Road".

Promotion
The performance of "My Love" was aired for the very first time on television on 31 August 2008, during the 43rd annual MDA Labor Day Telethon. On 28 October 2008, an episode of The Oprah Winfrey Show was dedicated to Dion, as well as several inspirational journeys of parents and their young children, who suffered from many diseases. Dion was featured throughout the special titled, Miracle Children with Celine Dion due to the personal struggles and difficulties she was facing at the time with childbirth. Towards the end of the special, she performed a live rendition of "My Love". The following day, Dion was forced to reschedule her concert of 30 October in Minneapolis, as well many others in November 2008, citing illness as the cause for the postponements. On 1 December 2008, she performed "My Love" on The Tonight Show with Jay Leno. On 13 December 2008, her official website posted a behind-the-scenes clip of Dion in the recording sessions for the song, "There Comes a Time". The Taking Chances World Tour ended on 26 February and on 1 March 2009, Dion gave her last public performance on Star Académie in Canada, singing a medley of her popular French and English-language songs alongside the contestants. Following the performance, Dion began her temporary retirement from the music industry, in order to focus time on her family and conceiving another child. Aside from the several televised appearances, "My Love" was performed throughout Dion's Taking Chances World Tour, beginning with her concert in Seoul on 18 March 2008. "My Love" was included later on the Taking Chances World Tour: The Concert, released on DVD and CD in April 2010.

Singles
My Love: Essential Collection was released while Dion was on her Taking Chances World Tour. During her concert in Stockholm, Sweden on 7 June 2008, Dion recorded a live version of "My Love", which was confirmed to be the first single from the compilation. The song premiered on the radio on 22 September 2008 and a digital single was released the next day, accompanied by a live music video. Chuck Taylor, senior editor of Billboard, said that "My Love" was an inspired choice from the album and complimented Linda Perry's composition and Dion's delivery of the song, calling it highly emotive ballad about ache and uncertainty. After "My Love" debuted on the US Adult Contemporary chart, Dion became the artist with the most adult contemporary hits in the 2000s, with "My Love" being her sixteenth entry of the decade. The song peaked at number fifteen. The next single, "I'm Alive" was remixed by Laurent Wolf and released in October 2008 to radio to promote the album in France, instead of "My Love". In January 2009, new remixes of "I'm Alive" by Maurice Joshua were sent to the US clubs. They reached number thirty-five on the Hot Dance Club Songs chart. "I'm Alive" was originally released as a single from A New Day Has Come in 2002 and peaked at number seven in France and number six on the US Adult Contemporary chart.

Critical reception

Stephen Thomas Erlewine, senior editor of AllMusic, called My Love: Essential Collection an overcompensation for how All the Way... A Decade of Song (1999), concentrated on newer recordings at the expense of hits. According to him, My Love: Essential Collection "fits the bill well" for those listeners who are looking for an overview of Celine Dion's two decades as an international superstar, as it has all her big adult contemporary hits. Erlewine also noted that although Dion has had more hits in the ten years since All the Way... A Decade of Song, apart from her cover of Roy Orbison's "I Drove All Night", almost none of her new-millennium hits are as memorable as her singles from the '90s.

Commercial reception
My Love: Essential Collection debuted at number eight on the US Billboard 200, becoming Dion's eleventh top ten album on the chart, with first week sales of 57,000 copies. On the Canadian Albums Chart, My Love: Essential Collection debuted at number two, with sales of 17,700 copies, and the following week, the album dropped to number three, selling another 11,000 copies. By its third week on the chart, My Love: Essential Collection sank another three spots to number six, and by January 2009, was certified double-Platinum by CRIA, denoting shipments of 160,000 copies.

In the United Kingdom, the album debuted at number five, selling 42,411 copies and was certified four-times Platinum for sales of over 1,200,000 units. In Ireland, it peaked at number one and was certified double-Platinum in 2008. My Love: Essential Collection proved to be very popular in these two countries, as it re-entered the charts many times over the years, spending 288 weeks (over five years) on the chart in Ireland.

It debuted at number one in France and the Netherlands, occupying the top for two weeks in both countries. My Love: Essential Collection also topped the chart in Belgium Flanders and peaked inside the top ten in many European countries, reaching number six on the European Top 100 Albums. The album also peaked inside top ten in New Zealand and Mexico, and was also certified Platinum in Belgium, Gold in Mexico, Finland, New Zealand and Hungary. Worldwide, it became the forty-second best selling album of 2008, according to the IFPI. In addition, Sony Music released The Essential in 2011, with the same track listing, which was certified Silver by the BPI in the UK as a standalone album.

Track listing

Notes
 signifies a co-producer
 signifies an additional producer
 signifies Italian translation
 signifies an assistant producer
 signifies additional production and remix

Personnel
Adapted from AllMusic.

 Walter Afanasieff – arranger, bass, composer, drum programming, keyboards, orchestral arrangements, orchestration, organ, organ (hammond), producer, programming, synclavier, synclavier guitar, synthesizer, synthesizer bass
 René Angélil – management
 Kenny Aronoff – drums
 Howard Ashman – composer
 Peer Åström – arranger, composer, guitar, instrumentation, mixing, producer, string arrangements, vocals (background)
 Jon Avnet – executive producer
 Babyface – composer, producer
 Anders Bagge – arranger, composer, producer
 Laila Bagge Wahlgren – composer
 Jeff Balding – engineer
 Jeff Barry – composer
 Alan Bergman – composer
 Marilyn Bergman – composer
 Curt Bisquera – cymbals, hi hat
 Roy Bittan – piano, piano (grand), piano arrangement, producer
 Paul Boutin – assistant engineer, mixing assistant
 Jeff Bova – arranger, keyboards, producer, programming, string arrangements, strings, synthesizer bass, track arrangement
 Stuart Brawley – assistant engineer, programming
 Robbie Buchanan – arranger
 Paul Buckmaster – string arrangements, string conductor
 Glen Burtnik – vocals (background)
 Teddy Campbell – drums
 Andreas Carlsson – composer, vocals (background)
 Eric Carmen – composer
 Chris Chaney – bass
 Maria Christensen – vocals (background)
 Steve Churchyard – engineer
 Kevin Churko – engineer, pro-tools
 Luis Conte – percussion
 Lynn Davis – vocals (background)
 Kara DioGuardi – composer, producer, vocals (background)
 Celine Dion – performer, vocals (background)
 Rory Dodd – vocals (background)
 Jörgen Elofsson – composer
 Steve Ferrone – drums
 David Foster – arranger, composer, executive producer, keyboards, piano, producer, vocal arrangement
 Humberto Gatica – engineer, mixing, vocal engineer
 Stephen George – programming
 Serban Ghenea – mixing
 Barry Gibb – composer, vocals (background)
 Maurice Gibb – composer, vocals (background)
 Robin Gibb – composer, vocals (background)
 Jim Gilstrap – vocals (background)
 Gerry Goffin – composer
 Jean-Jacques Goldman – composer, producer
 Delta Goodrem – composer, vocals (background)
 Gavin Greenaway – string arrangements, string conductor
 Ellie Greenwich – composer
 Mick Guzauski – mixing
 Daryl Hall – composer
 Leah Haywood – vocals (background)
 Nana Hedin – vocals (background)
 Jerry Hey – arranger, conductor
 Andy Hill – composer
 Dan Hill – composer
 Tony Hinnigan – penny whistle
 David Hodges – piano
 Loris Holland – choir director, keyboards, organ (hammond)
 James Horner – composer, producer
 Mark Hudson – composer
 Dann Huff – guitar
 Phillip Ingram – vocals (background)
 Paul Jackson Jr. – guitar
 Jimmy Jam – arranger, producer
 Will Jennings – composer
 Skyler Jett – vocals (background)
 Quincy Jones – producer
 R. Kelly – arranger, composer, producer
 Tom Kelly – composer
 Carole King – composer
 Emanuel Kiriakou – bass, engineer, guitar (acoustic), guitar (electric), percussion, piano, producer, programming
 Kofi – vocals (background)
 Savan Kotecha – composer
 Eric Kupper – keyboard programming
 Abe Laboriel Jr. – drums
 Michael Landau – guitar
 Robert John "Mutt" Lange – composer, guitar, producer, vocals (background)
 Terry Lewis – producer
 Ottmar Liebert – guitar (acoustic)
 Tomas Lindberg – bass
 Chris Lord-Alge – mixing
 Kristian Lundin – composer, engineer, keyboards, mixing, producer, programming, vocals (background)
 Ewan MacColl – composer
 Stephen Marcussen – mastering
 George Martin – conductor, orchestral arrangements, producer
 Giles Martin – assistant producer
 Max Martin – composer, engineer, keyboards, mixing, producer, programming, vocals (background)
 Eddie Martinez – guitar
 Richard Marx – composer
 Rob Mathes – conductor, orchestral arrangements, orchestration
 Jean McClain – vocals (background)
 Gunther Mende – composer
 Alan Menken – composer
 Rickey Minor – bass (acoustic)
 Chieli Minucci – guitar
 Stephan Moccio – composer
 Ben Moody – producer
 Ennio Morricone – composer
 Jamie Muhoberac – keyboards
 Christopher Neil – producer, vocals (background)
 Tom Nichols – composer
 Anna Nordell – vocals (background)
 Aldo Nova – composer, guitar, Irish fiddle, producer, soloist
 Rick Nowels – composer, gut string guitar, keyboards, producer
 Marty O'Brien – bass (acoustic)
 Jeanette Olsson – vocals (background)
 Phil Palmer – guitar
 Dean Parks – guitar
 Linda Perry – composer
 Tim Renwick – guitar
 Taylor Rhodes – composer
 Cathy Richardson – vocals (background)
 Claytoven Richardson – vocals (background)
 John Robinson – drums
 Guy Roche – arranger, engineer, producer, synthesizer
 William Ross – arranger, Conductor, orchestration, orchestral arrangements, string arrangements
 Todd Rundgren – vocal arrangement, vocals (background)
 Jennifer Rush – composer
 Mark Russell – production coordination
 Carole Bayer Sager – composer, producer
 John Shanks – bass, composer, guitar, mixing, producer, vocals (background)
 Dan Shea – drum programming, keyboards, programming, sound design
 John Sheard – composer
 Peter Sinfield – composer
 Phil Spector – composer
 Billy Steinberg – composer, producer
 Jim Steinman – arranger, composer, producer, track arrangement
 David A. Stewart – composer
 Kasim Sulton – vocals (background)
 Ian Thomas – drums
 Linda Thompson – composer
 Michael Thompson – guitar
 Pat Thrall – engineer
 Jeanie Tracy – vocals (background)
 Eric Troyer – vocals (background)
 Shania Twain – vocals (background)
 Luther Vandross – composer
 Maria Vidal – vocals (background)
 Ric Wake – arranger, producer, remix producer
 Diane Warren – composer
 Greg Wells – composer
 Jerry Wexler – composer
 Will Wheaton – vocals (background)
 Paul Wickens – bass, keyboards
 Aaron Zigman – programming
 Peter Zizzo – composer, guitar, vocals (background)

Charts

Weekly charts

Year-end charts

All-time charts

Certifications and sales

The Essential
In July 2011, My Love: Ultimate Essential Collection was re-issued with the same track listing as part of Sony Music's The Essential line. It charted or was certified separately from the original release.

Charts

Weekly charts

Year-end charts

Certifications

Release history

See also
 2008 in British music charts
 List of number-one albums of 2008 (Ireland)

References

External links
 
 

2008 greatest hits albums
Celine Dion compilation albums